FC CSKA 1948 Sofia is a Bulgarian football club from the village of Bistritsa. The team plays its home matches at the Bistritsa Stadium and competes in Bulgaria's First League. The colours of the club are red and white.

The club was founded in 2016 by a group of CSKA supporters who opposed Grisha Ganchev's recognition of Litex Lovech for CSKA Sofia after the bankruptcy of the old club. The new club quickly progressed from the lower levels of the football system and was eventually promoted to the top level in 2020.

History

Foundation 
The club was founded on 19 July 2016, at a meeting at the Central Military Club in Sofia. The members of the Constituent Assembly announced partnership with Errea and a new crest close to CSKA Septemvriisko Zname.

2016–2018: Amateur Leagues 
On 21 August 2016, FC 1948 won its first cup in a friendly four-team tournament in Kokalyane. The team defeated Akademik Sofia 1–0 in the final.

In its first official game for the 2016–17 season in A OFG Sofia (capital) South, FC 1948 won 8–0 against Lyulin Sofia. The club began playing its home games at Vasil Levski Stadium, but later during the season used the stadiums in Obelya and German. FC 1948 won its group and became champion of the whole A OFG Sofia (capital) after victory 4–3 against Nadezhda Dobroslavtsi. Then, on 7 June 2017, the team played with Bratsigovo in order to qualify for the Third League and won after penalties (7–6). Beside that, FC 1948 reached the final for the Cup of Bulgarian Amateur Football League, which they lost on 25 May 2017 to the club from the Third league FC Chernomorets Balchik.

For their first season in the third division of the Bulgarian football (2017–18), the club moved to Dragalevtsi Stadium, in order to comply with the requirements of the respective league. After very strong performance, on 19 May 2018 FC 1948 secured its place in Second Professional League. The team finished with 29 wins, 5 draws and no losses, as two players of the Reds became goalscorers of the South-West Third League – Andon Gushterov and Petko Petkov. Also, FC 1948 had again a good campaign for the Cup of Bulgarian Amateur Football League, this time reaching the semi-finals.

2018–2020: Second Professional League 
For the beginning of the 2018–19 season in the Second Professional League, FC 1948 moved to Vasil Levski Stadium due to the higher league it is playing in. Strong selection of professional players was done, as the goal for the season is qualification for First League. After four rounds, manager Valentin Iliev, who managed the club from the very beginning, was replaced with Petko Petkov. FC 1948 eventually finished fourth, three points below the promotion playoff place, which was occupied by Arda Kardzhali. Although FC 1948 didn't promote to the elite in their first attempt, the team established itself as a strong contender for promotion.

For the 2019–20 season, FC 1948 started the season on a high note, defeating local rivals Lokomotiv Sofia 2–0 at home. This was followed by an away win at newly promoted Spartak Pleven with a score of 1–4. Another dominant 2–0 win against Spartak Varna earned the team three out of three wins in their first three matches. An away win against Montana, followed by a home destruction of OFC Pomorie extended their winning steak to 5 games. FC 1948's spectacular form continued, as the team defeated Lokomotiv Gorna Oryahovitsa and Strumska Slava in the following rounds. The team then beat fellow Sofia rivals Septemvri Sofia 5–0 at home. The first defeat of the season came in the tenth round, when FC 1948 lost 1–0 to Litex Lovech. After a 2–0 home win against Chernomorets Balchik, FC 1948 suffered another loss in the hands of Kariana Erden. This was followed by three consecutive wins, which ended with a disappointing 2–2 home draw against Ludogorets II. Following that, the team managed to win two away games, against Botev Galabovo and Lokomotiv Sofia again, which put them in second place in the table, three points behind Septemvri Sofia, before the winter break.

2020–present: First Professional League 
FC 1948 secured their First League spot for the 2020–21 season after finishing 1st in the 2019–20 Second League. Krasimir Balakov was announced as manager for the new season on 2 June, and the club unveiled a new logo on 30 June in preparation for their First League debut. On 7 August the team faced CSKA in its first game of the new season, the encounter resulted in a 2–2 draw.

Club culture 
Until 2022, the club had a policy of relying exclusively on Bulgarian players, which gained the approval of many of the club's supporters who had previously criticized CSKA Sofia for fielding teams with many foreign footballers. The club also has a relatively small fan base, mostly composed of former CSKA Sofia fans who did not approve of Grisha Ganchev’s ownership of the club.

Shirt, sponsor and mascot 
The colours of the team main kit are red and white. The second kit is in white and the third – in black, with white sleeves.

On 31 January 2017 CSKA 1948 presented its main sponsor – Efbet. The company sponsors not only the first team, but the academy too.

Since 2018, the team mascot is Army the lion.

Honours 
First League:
5th place (1): 2020–21

Second League:
 Winners (1): 2019–20
Third League:

 Winners (1): 2017–18
A OFG Sofia:

 Winners (1): 2016–17

Cup of Bulgarian Amateur Football League:
 Runners-up (1): 2016–17

Players

Current squad 

 

 

For recent transfers, see Transfers summer 2022 and Transfers winter 2022–23.

Out on loan

Foreign players 
Up to twenty foreign nationals can be registered and given a squad number for the first team in the Bulgarian First League, however only five non-EU nationals can be used during a match day. Those non-EU nationals with European ancestry can claim citizenship from the nation their ancestors came from. If a player does not have European ancestry he can claim Bulgarian citizenship after playing in Bulgaria for 5 years.

EU Nationals
  Simeon Petrov
  Aleksandar Kolev
  Lazar Marin

EU Nationals (Dual citizenship)
  Carlos Ohene
  Ryan Bidounga
  Octávio
  Henrique
  Hennadiy Hanyev
  Steve Furtado

Non-EU Nationals
 Tiago
 Héliton
 Sidcley
 Pedrinho
  Parvizdzhon Umarbayev

Second-team squad

Goalscoring and appearance records 

Includes appearances in First League, Second League, Third League, Bulgarian Cup, Bulgarian Supercup, UEFA Champions League and UEFA Europa League.
Players in bold are still playing for FC 1948.

Players in bold are still playing for FC 1948.

Notable players

Had international caps for their respective countries, or held any club record. Players whose name is listed in bold represented their countries.

Bulgaria
 Emil Gargorov 
 Martin Kamburov 
 Galin Ivanov 
 Ivan Karadzhov 
 Daniel Mladenov 
 Mariyan Ognyanov 
 Dimitar Pirgov 
 Apostol Popov 
 Ventsislav Vasilev 

 Radoslav Kirilov 
 Andon Gushterov 
 Angel Lyaskov 
 Aleksandar Kolev 
 Georgi Rusev 
 Denislav Aleksandrov 
 Ivaylo Chochev 
 Daniel Naumov 
 Birsent Karagaren 

Asia
 Parvizdzhon Umarbayev

Africa
 Steve Furtado
 Ryan Bidounga

Club officials

Coaching staff and personnel

Manager history

Seasons

League positions

See also 
 List of fan-owned sports teams
 F.C. United of Manchester
 AFC Wimbledon
 C.F. Os Belenenses
 CSA Steaua București

References

External links 
Official website
bgclubs.eu

 
Football clubs in Bulgaria
Association football clubs established in 2016
2016 establishments in Bulgaria
CSKA 1948
Phoenix clubs (association football)